Anderson, named after Chief William Anderson, is a city in and the county seat of Madison County, Indiana, United States. It is the principal city of the Anderson, Indiana Metropolitan Statistical Area which encompasses Madison County. Anderson is the headquarters of the Church of God (Anderson) and home of Anderson University, which is affiliated with the Christian denomination. Highlights of the city include the historic Paramount Theatre and the Gruenewald Historic House.

The population was 56,129  at the 2010 census, down from 70,000 in 1970.

History
Prior to the organization of Madison County, William Conner entered the land upon which Anderson is located. Conner later sold the ground to John and Sarah Berry, who donated  of their land to Madison County on the condition that the county seat be moved from Pendleton to Anderson. John Berry laid out the first plat of Anderson on November 7, 1827. In 1828 the seat of justice was moved from Pendleton to Anderson.

The city is named for Chief William "Adam" Anderson, whose mother was Lenape and whose father was of Swedish descent. Chief Anderson's name in Lenape was Kikthawenund meaning "creaking boughs". The Delaware village was known as Anderson's Town, though the Moravian Missionaries called it "The Heathen Town Four Miles Away." Anderson was also known as Andersonton before being formally organized as Anderson.

Introduction of internal improvements by the Mammoth Internal Improvement Act caused a growth in the population in 1837. In December, 1838, Anderson was incorporated as a town with 350 inhabitants. The Central Canal, a branch of the Wabash and Erie Canal, was planned to come through Anderson. Work continued on the canal during 1838 and the beginning of 1839, but work on the canal was soon suspended by the state following the Panic of 1837. The town again became a sleepy village until 1849 when it was incorporated a second time as a town. Many new commercial ventures located around the Courthouse Square.

This incorporation was short-lived and Anderson once again went back to village status in 1852. However, with the completion of the Indianapolis Bellefontaine Railroad, as well as their station in 1852, Anderson burst to life. The third incorporation of Anderson as a town occurred on June 9, 1853. The population continued to increase. On August 28, 1865, with a population of nearly 1,300 people, Anderson was incorporated as a city.

Between 1853 and the late 19th century, twenty industries of various sizes located there. On March 31, 1887, natural gas was discovered in Anderson. As the Indiana Gas Boom began, this discovery led new businesses that could use natural gas, such as glass-making, to move to the city. Anderson grew to such proportions that a Cincinnati newspaper editor labeled the city "The Pittsburgh on White River." Other appellations were "Queen City of the Gas Belt" and (because of the vulcanizing and the rubber tire manufacturing business) "Puncture Proof City."

In 1897 the Interurban Railroad was born in Anderson. Charles Henry, a large stock holder, coined the term "Interurban" in 1893. It continued to operate until 1941.

The year 1912 spelled disaster for Anderson: the natural gas ran out, due to the residents squandering their resources.  The city left its gas powered lights on day and night, and there are stories of a pocket of natural gas being lit in the river and burning for a prolonged period for the spectacle of it. The result of the loss of natural gas was that several factories moved out. The whole city slowed down. The Commercial Club (formed on November 18, 1905) was the forerunner of the present chamber of commerce.

This club persuaded the Remy brothers to stay in Anderson and others to locate there. For decades, Delco Remy and Guide Lamp (later Fisher Guide), which during World War II built the M3 submachine gun and the FP-45 Liberator pistol for the allies, were the top two employers in the city. From 1913 through the 1950s, the Ward-Stilson Company was one of the country's largest producers of uniforms, regalia, furniture and props for the Freemasons, the Odd Fellows and dozens of other U.S. fraternal organizations.

The Church of God of Anderson located its world headquarters in Anderson in 1905. Anderson Bible School was opened in 1917, and this was separated from Gospel Trumpet (now known as Warner Press) in 1925. At the same time, it became known as Anderson Bible School and Seminary. In 1925, the name was changed to Anderson College and then to Anderson University in 1988.

Over the years, 17 different types of automobiles were manufactured in Anderson with the Lambert family among the city's leaders in its development and Buckeye Gasoline Buggy the Lambert product. Many other inventions were perfected in Anderson including: the gas regulator (Miron G. Reynolds), the stamp vending machine (Frank P. Dunn), clothes presser (H. Donald Forse), "Irish Mail" handcars (Hugh Hill), flower car for funeral homes (Francis M. McClain, automatic gearshift (Von D. Polhemus)), Sisson choke (Glenn Sisson), and the vulcanizing process to retread tires (Charles E. Miller).

Anderson hosted a National Basketball Association (NBA) franchise for the 1949–50 season, being one of the smaller cities to have had a major league franchise in a Big Four American sport. The Anderson Packers were a founding member of the NBA (under that name), but folded after one season.

Like most other industrial cities in Indiana and the Rust Belt as a whole, Anderson suffered tremendously from deindustrialization in the 1970s and 1980s. For example, nearly 22,000 people were employed by General Motors in the 1970s; by 2006 this number had declined to fewer than 2,600. Anderson has since struggled with higher rates of poverty and unemployment.

Geography
The city of Anderson is located in parts of six townships: Anderson, Union, Richland, Lafayette, Adams, and Fall Creek.

Climate

Demographics

2010 census
As of the 2010 census, there were people, households, and families living in the city. The racial makeup of the city was 78.8% White, 15.2% African American, 0.3% Native American, 0.5% Asian, 2.6% from other races, and 2.6% from two or more races. Hispanic or Latino of any race were 4.8% of the population.

Of the extant households 28.8% had children under the age of 18 living with them, 35.8% were married couples living together, 17.1% had a female householder with no husband present, 5.5% had a male householder with no wife present, and 41.6% were non-families. 34.5% of all households were made up of individuals, and 13.8% had someone living alone who was 65 years of age or older. The average household size was 2.28 and the average family size was 2.91.

The median age in the city was 37.8 years. 22.4% of residents were under the age of 18; 11.5% were between the ages of 18 and 24; 24.8% were from 25 to 44; 24.9% were from 45 to 64; and 16.3% were 65 years of age or older. The gender makeup of the city was 47.9% male and 52.1% female.

2000 census
As of the 2000 census, there were people,  households, and families living in the city. The racial makeup of the city was 81.99% White, 14.88% African American, 0.31% Native American, 0.49% Asian, 0.02% Pacific Islander, 0.86% from other races, and 1.45% from two or more races. Hispanic or Latino of any race were 2.07% of the population.

There were 25,274 households, out of which 27.0% had children under the age of 18 living with them, 41.4% were married couples living together, 15.1% had a female householder with no husband present, and 39.0% were non-families. 33.1% of all households were made up of individuals, and 14.0% had someone living alone who was 65 years of age or older. The average household size was 2.28 and the average family size was 2.87.

In the city, the age distribution of the population shows 23.2% under the age of 18, 11.2% from 18 to 24, 27.6% from 25 to 44, 21.3% from 45 to 64, and 16.6% who were 65 years of age or older. The median age was 36 years. For every 100 females, there

Government
The city government consists of a mayor and a city council. The mayor is elected in citywide vote. The city council consists of nine members. Six are elected from individual districts. Three members are elected at large.

Economy
When General Motors closed its operations in Anderson, the city was dealt a major economic blow as GM was the biggest employer in Anderson. Nevertheless, in 2007, Anderson was ranked 98th in the Forbes List for 100 Best Places for Businesses among Smaller U.S. Metro areas. However, a more recent (2014) appraisal of Anderson from the Indiana Business Review was mixed noting that "long-term trends are negative", citing "a long-term downward trend in area employment" and "acceleration in the number of food stamp recipients". More recent unemployment has been reduced, but improvements still lag behind the rest of the state.

For 2013, estimated household median income was $33,574 (vs. Indiana state median of $48,248). Per capita money income was $18,216 (Indiana per capita of $24,635). 25.8% of the city's population was estimated at living below poverty level, vs. a statewide estimation of 15.4%. Madison County, of which Anderson is the seat, has nearly three times as many food stamps recipients per capita as does Indiana as a whole.

As of February 2019, the ten largest employers in Madison County were:

Points of interest

 Downtown Historic District
 Anderson Speedway, Home of the Pay Less Little 500 and Redbud 400
 Paramount Theatre
 Mounds State Park
 Hoosier Park Racing and Casino
 Shadyside Memorial Park and Lake
 The Anderson Center for the Arts
 Madison County Historical Center
 In addition to the Downtown Historic District, Paramount Theatre, Mounds State Park, and The Anderson Center for the Arts, the Anderson Bank Building, Central Avenue School, Gruenewald House, Tower Hotel, West Central Historic District, and West Eighth Street Historic District are listed in the National Register of Historic Places.

Education
Anderson's public school district is the Anderson Community School Corporation, which includes one high school, Anderson High School which serves grades 9 – 12; one junior high school, Highland Middle School (formerly Highland High School) which serves grades 6 – 8, six elementary schools (Eastside, Edgewood, Valley Grove, 10th Street, Erskine, Anderson Elementary) which serve k -5, a kindergarten center (Killbuck), and a preschool (Southview).  Until 1997, Anderson had three high schools: Highland, Madison Heights and Anderson. In 1997 Madison Heights was closed and Anderson High School moved into that facility. Beginning in the fall of 2010, Highland High School closed and was converted into a junior high school, consolidating all students in grades 9-12 into Anderson High School.

Anderson also has a charter school (non-traditional, tuition-free public school) called Anderson Preparatory Academy.  Currently, Anderson Preparatory Academy features grades K-12.  Anderson Preparatory Academy is a college preparatory, military-based academy.  All cadets in grades 6-8 are members of the Civil Air Patrol.  High school cadets are all members of the Air Force JROTC program. Original plans called to only offer grades 6–9, then add on another upper grade each year before extending the lower years.

Anderson University, a campus of the Ivy Tech Community College of Indiana, and a campus of the Purdue Polytechnic Institute are also located within the city.

The city has a lending library, the Anderson Public Library.

In fiction
In the comic strip Peanuts, a book in the fictional series beloved by Snoopy, "The Six Bunny Wunnies", is called The Six Bunnie-Wunnies and Their Layover in Anderson, Indiana. (Charles Schulz had been recently awarded an honorary degree by Anderson College.)

Anderson is the home of several characters in the alternate history novel The Man with the Iron Heart by Harry Turtledove.

Notable people
 Harold Achor, Justice of the Indiana Supreme Court
 Jermaine Allensworth, athlete
 Lowell Amos, convicted "Black Widower" murderer
 Melvin E. Biddle, World War II Medal of Honor recipient
 Don Brandon, Hall of Fame baseball coach from Anderson University
 Jann Browne, Country music singer
 Gary Burton, jazz vibraphonist
 Bob Carey, Indy car driver
 Everett Case, nicknamed "Gray Fox", basketball coach notable for tenure at North Carolina State University, 1946–1964
 Buck Crouse, MLB catcher
 James Davis, politician, Secretary of Labor
 Winfield T. Durbin, politician, former Governor of Indiana
 Cory Edwards, producer of Hoodwinked!; created internet series Krogzilla on Smosh's Shut Up Cartoons channel
 Carl Erskine, MLB pitcher for Brooklyn and Los Angeles Dodgers; member of 1955 World Series champion Dodgers
 Gordon Gordon, crime novelist
 Krystal Harris, singer
 Charles L. Henry, politician, congressman, coiner of term "interurban"
 Orville Hodge, embezzler
 Gary Hoover, American businessperson, author, entrepreneur
 Robert Kessler, 1st Team All-American and 2x First-team Big Ten basketball player for Purdue University from 1933 to 1936
 James Kilgore, Symbionese Liberation Army member
 John William Lambert, inventor of first successful U.S. gasoline automobile
 Adam Lind, MLB player for Washington Nationals, Seattle Mariners
 Matt Lutz, actor
 Von Mansfield, NFL defensive back
 Brittany Mason, Model
 Mack Mattingly, politician, Georgia senator
 Gary McGhee, professional basketball player
 Jon McLaughlin, singer
 Phyllis Reynolds Naylor, author
 Phill Niblock, composer and filmmaker
 Bruce Nickells, harness racing driver and trainer.
 Sandi Patty, singer
 Amber Portwood, TV personality
 James Rebhorn, actor
 Robert L. Rock, Mayor of Anderson, Lieutenant Governor of Indiana
 Kris Roe (The Ataris), singer
 Fred Mustard Stewart, author
 Kevin Stein, Poet Laureate of Illinois
 Max Terhune, actor
 Ray Tolbert, basketball player for Indiana's 1981 NCAA championship team
 Albert Henry Vestal, majority whip of House of Representatives, 1923–1931
 Len Walston, singer-songwriter and music producer
 Louis J. Weichmann,  witness for the prosecution in the trial of the alleged conspirators involved in the assassination of Abraham Lincoln
 Bob Wilkerson, basketball player for Indiana's undefeated 1976 NCAA championship team
 Jumping Johnny Wilson

References

External links

 City website
 Anderson Public Library
 The Herald Bulletin

 
Cities in Indiana
Cities in Madison County, Indiana
County seats in Indiana
Indianapolis metropolitan area